The 2008 U.S. Men's Clay Court Championships was a men's tennis tournament played on outdoor clay courts. It was the 40th edition of the U.S. Men's Clay Court Championships, and was part of the International Series of the 2008 ATP Tour. It took place at River Oaks Country Club in Houston, Texas, United States, from April 14 through April 20, 2008. Seventh-seeded Marcel Granollers-Pujol won the singles title.

The singles draw featured ATP No. 8, 2007 Davis Cup champion and Delray Beach finalist James Blake, Indian Wells quarterfinalist Tommy Haas, and Miami Masters runner-up Mardy Fish. Among other top players competing were Las Vegas winner Sam Querrey, Acapulco quarterfinalist Agustín Calleri, Dudi Sela, Marcel Granollers-Pujol and Óscar Hernández.

Finals

Singles

 Marcel Granollers-Pujol defeated  James Blake, 6–4, 1–6, 7–5
It was Marcel Granollers-Pujol's 1st career title.

Doubles

 Ernests Gulbis /  Rainer Schüttler defeated  Pablo Cuevas /  Marcel Granollers-Pujol, 7–5, 7–6(7–3)

References

External links
 Official website
 Singles draw
 Doubles draw